Klüver or Kluver may refer to:

Billy Klüver (1927–2004), American electrical engineer at Bell Telephone Laboratories who founded Experiments in Art and Technology
Felipe Klüver (born 2000), Uruguayan rower
Heinrich Klüver (1897–1979), German-American psychologist born in Holstein, Germany
Johan Wilhelm Klüver (born 1910), Norwegian sailor who was highly decorated after the Second World War
Cayla Kluver (born 1992), author of the Legacy series

See also
Klüver–Bucy syndrome, behavioral disorder named after Heinrich Klüver and Paul Bucy that occurs when both the right and left medial temporal lobes of the brain malfunction